Mehrdad Abdi is an Iranian football midfielder who plays for Nassaji in the Persian Gulf Pro League.

References 

Living people
Sportspeople from Mazandaran province
Association football midfielders
Iranian footballers
Persian Gulf Pro League players
1992 births
Gol Gohar players
Nassaji Mazandaran players
Saipa F.C. players
People from Nowshahr